was a Japanese photographer.

References

Japanese photographers
1921 births
2003 deaths